Pappa Ante Portas is a 1991 German comedy film directed by Loriot, who also played the leading role and wrote the script, and Renate Westphal-Lorenz. This was Loriot's second and final feature film, after 1988's Ödipussi.

Synopsis
Heinrich Lohse is a manager at the "Deutsche Röhren AG", a pipe manufacturing company, who increasingly tends to lose control. After ordering a 40-year supply of typewriting paper and erasers (because of quantity discount), his boss forces him to retire.

Confronted with this new situation, Lohse's family reacts in shock. It turns out Heinrich's wife Renate and his son Dieter were quite comfortable with the absent husband and father and do not want to see their situation disrupted. Heinrich, however, refuses to allow his career to end and immediately begins to rearrange the Lohse household based on his questionable managerial skills. This leads to a steadily increasing series of conflicts with his wife, son, and friends that get more and more bizarre.

Starting out with buying a ridiculous amount of mustard to get discount, Heinrich finally invites a film crew to shoot a television series in the Lohse household in order to impress his wife. The more he tries, however, the worse it gets, and Renate seriously questions their marriage.

In the end, both visit the birthday party of Renate's mother at which conflicts of other family members are revealed that seem even more dramatic than those of Heinrich and Renate. By realizing this, both accept their new situation and try to find together again as a couple. The last shot shows Heinrich and Renate playing a very amateurish recorder concert in their living room in front of their son Dieter and Mrs. Kleinert, their cleaning lady.

Cast
 Loriot as Heinrich Lohse / Grandpa Hoppenstedt / Lothar Frohwein / violinist
 Evelyn Hamann as Renate Lohse
 Irm Hermann as Hedwig, Renate's sister
 Hans-Peter Korff as Hellmuth, Hedwig's husband
 Dagmar Biener as Brigitte Mielke, a neighbour
 Ortrud Beginnen as Gertrud Mielke, Brigitte's sister
 Inge Wolffberg as Mrs. Kleinert, cleaning lady
 Gerrit Schmidt-Foß as Dieter, the Lohses's son
 Hans-Helmut Müller as Ernst Drögel, chocolate manufacturer

Background
The title "Pappa ante portas" alludes to Hannibal ante portas! ("Hannibal before the gates!"), an often-cited Roman call referring to Carthaginian commander Hannibal on his way to Rome to conquer it in 211 BC.
Pappa is an alternative spelling of German "papa" (dad).
Director Loriot said it would be a family's best-known call of fear and thus would fit perfectly with his story.

The film was shot at the Babelsberg Studios in Potsdam, with most outside scenes being shot in Berlin. The final scene in which the birthday party is held was shot at Ahlbeck Pier.

Commercial success
Approximately 3.5 million people saw the film in movie theaters. This makes it the most successful German movie production in 1991.
In the same year, due to its commercial success, the film received the 'Goldene Leinwand'.

External links

References
"Pappa ante Portas", DVD, Universum Film GmbH, ASIN: B002H2WR5K

1991 films
1991 comedy films
German comedy films
1990s German-language films
Films produced by Horst Wendlandt
1990s German films